Escapist Dream is a science fiction novel written by Louis Bulaong and published on July 26, 2020. The novel is set in a near future where virtual reality has become a norm and where geeks can use it to gain superpowers and extraordinary abilities. It was written by the author as a homage to geek culture from comics, films, anime and video games.

Plot
The story takes place in a virtual reality world known as the Escapist Dream, where all kinds of geeks can live a life of superpowered adventures based on their favorite film, comic, anime, novel or video game characters.

Two individuals – a shy teenage geek named Charlie, and a serious programmer named Jim – came to the Escapist Dream for different reasons. One came to this virtual reality to have fun while the other was sent to fix bugs that have been plaguing the Escapist Dream. Charlie and Jim would soon find out how the bugs have caused madness in this place, and must now work together to protect themselves and save the Escapist Dream.

The world of the Escapist Dream is divided into different areas: Stan City is a place where American comic book and superhero fans reside, Otaku Academy is the place for Japanese otaku and anime fans, Gamer's Den is video game-like area for gamers, The Library is the area for bookworms and fans of classic literature, and Zone of the Macabre is a dark place for fans of controversial medium. Both Charlie and Jim have to journey through each areas to find and remove the viruses affecting the virtual reality world.

Background
According to the book’s afterword, the novel was inspired by the comic books, anime and video games that author Louis Bulaong grew up with in his childhood. As a homage, it took tropes from different media and contained a number of pop cultural references. In his own words, he stated, "I created this novel as a homage to the comics, anime, movies, books, series and video games that I grew up in. I wanted to accurately portray today’s geek culture with tons of pop culture references, pastiches and satires. And similar to what Alan Moore did when he wrote The League of Extraordinary Gentlemen, I also envisioned this book as a time capsule for future geeks who might want to know what geeks back then liked to read about."

Themes and style
Escapist Dream was written in a smooth flow of thoughts, with extensive use of conjunctions, in the author’s Filipino-English accent. The book became known for combining wacky pop culture references with serious psychological themes. When using references, critic Joanna Kane Larius described Louis Bulaong as a "subtle artist who challenges his readers to find out what that reference is and its purpose in the story." He used references from a variety of media and often used satire to both praise and mock the styles and traditions of said media. All of his references are specifically tied and integrated to certain fandoms, characters and settings, rather that just using it as a form of humor or trivia. 

As a psychology graduate, Louis Bulaong also included aspects and principles of mental health into the story. Many of the characters have suffered from negative life experiences and trauma, which make up most of their personalities and characteristics. The writing style of Escapist Dream is noted to be more interpersonal than other similar books of the same genre, where there is a primary focus on character emotions.

Reception
Author Justin Kidd praised the book as a pop culture masterpiece, stating "The large amounts of pop culture references were well-written and well-integrated into the story, unlike some who only add references for the sake of it. These references both described and satirized geeks in a humorous and intellectual way. In the world of literature and geek culture, Escapist Dream is by far, The Great Gatsby of Pop Culture Fiction." Author Kayla Krantz gave it a 4/5, saying "This is a long read, but definitely immersive. The characters were relatable in their own ways."

The novel also received positive reviews from various online publications. Roldan Tan from Rewritee included it in his “5 Best GameLit and LitRPG Books”, saying “Of all GameLit books in history, none is as grand in scale as this one-of-a kind novel.” The review also added, “In its portrayal of gaming culture, author Louis Bulaong really nailed every trope from video games and the gaming community in general. While the story praises the talents gamers possess, it also satirizes many of gaming culture’s funniest quirks, from trash-talking, using cheats, the console wars, and to the war against microtransactions.”

Carl Hannigan from Geeks gave it a 5 out of 5 rating, stating “I’m not being hyperbolic when I say that this is one of the best GameLit novels I have ever read. The style of writing was compact and concise and every character was really well-written and relatable. Of course, the book is not perfect. It starts too slow and the ending was a bit stretched. But I assure you the more you read it, the more you will fall in love with the place and the characters if you yourself is a geek." John Almond from Gonevis called it a "well-written love letter to all geeks, young and old, of any fandom and medium."

Joanna Kane Larius of Booksie praised the book, saying, "When it comes to writing about geek fiction and culture, Escapist Dream is the king. Even if you take away the pop culture references and its geekiness, it is still the superior book that details the mental and emotional struggles that its characters went through. And all the way, you just had to cheer and cry as the story progress and said characters stumble through every adversity. I’ve never read a book that really portrays geeks in a fun and creative way as Louis Bulaong’s novel." 

Peyton F., owner and operator of the site Peyton Writes, gave the book a mixed review, saying, “It’s good in some places, great in others, and really, really dull at worst. But, as a first time author (besides the fan fictions and blog posts he’s written), Bulaong told a captivating story without trying so hard on pop culture knowledge for it to make sense.”

Sequel
In 2021, a sequel entitled Otaku Girl was published by Louis Bulaong, first as a webnovel, before being published in KDP.

References

2020 science fiction novels
Action novels
Novels about virtual reality
Young adult novels
2020 debut novels
Nerd culture
Self-published books